Jemeiko Jennings (born 15 September 1981) is a Bermudian retired international footballer who played as a defender.

Club career
Jennings played for local side North Village Rams and had a spell with the Bermuda Hogges in the USL Second Division in 2008.

He also played for Royal in the Island Soccer League.

International career
He made his debut for Bermuda in a February 2004 friendly match against Trinidad and Tobago and earned a total of 10 caps, scoring 0 goals. He has represented his country in 1 FIFA World Cup qualification match.

His final international match was an August 2008 CONCACAF Gold Cup qualification match against the Cayman Islands.

References

External links

1981 births
Living people
Place of birth missing (living people)
Association football defenders
Bermudian footballers
Bermuda international footballers
North Village Rams players
Bermuda Hogges F.C. players
USL Second Division players